Pleolipoviridae is a family of DNA viruses that infect archaea.

Taxonomy
The following genera are recognized:
Alphapleolipovirus
Betapleolipovirus
Gammapleolipovirus

References

Viruses